Phuoc Sang Films is a private film studio in Vietnam. It was founded in 2004 by actor Lưu Phước Sang. Some notable motion pictures have been produced under its trademark - including:
Khi đàn ông có bầu (When Men Get Pregnant) - 2004
Đẻ mướn (Renting Maternity) - 2005
Hồn Trương Ba da Hàng thịt
Áo lụa Hà Đông (The White Silk Dress) - 2006
Võ lâm truyền kỳ (Swordsman) - 2007 - in collaboration with Thien Ngan Pictures
Mười - The Legend of a Portrait  - 2007 (CJ Entertainment) - Vietnamese production and distribution
Phát tài (Become Rich) - 2008
Huyền thoại bất tử (The Immortal Legend) - 2009 - starring Dustin Nguyen
Đại gia đình
Công chúa teen và ngũ hổ tướng - 2010
Lâu Đài Tình Ái - 2011
Thiên sứ 99 - 2011
Hello cô Ba - 2012
Xóm gà - 2012
Yêu anh ! Em dám không ? - 2013

References

Vietnamese companies established in 2004
Mass media companies of Vietnam
Film studios